Vijay Kumar Pandey is professional media personality of Nepali television. He hosts popular program called Dishanirdesh. Pandey's career begun with the Nepal Television show Andhyaro Ujyalo in 1987, followed by several other television projects, as well as a stint on radio with the talk programme Sanibaar Vijay Kumar Sanga on Kantipur FM. He was also the founding editor of Nepal Magazine and has long been a columnist at Kantipur daily, as well as a consultant editor at Kantipur Television.
The debut book Khusi was launched by Namkha Rinpoche on 12 September 2014 in Kathmandu. 
Nepal's most prestigious literary award Madan Puraskar for 2015 has been awarded to Pandey for his book Khushi.

Bibliography 
 Khushi – 2014
 Sambandhaharu - 2020

References

Nepalese television personalities
Year of birth missing (living people)
Living people